Mount Roskill is a parliamentary electorate in Auckland, New Zealand, returning one Member of Parliament (MP) to the New Zealand House of Representatives. Phil Goff of the Labour Party held the seat from the  until he resigned from Parliament on 12 October 2016 after contesting and being elected Mayor of Auckland on 8 October 2016 in the 2016 mayoral election. His resignation necessitated a byelection in this electorate which was won by Michael Wood.

Mount Roskill is located on the western side of the Auckland isthmus, bordering the Manukau Harbour. It is anchored around the suburbs of Mount Roskill, Three Kings, Hillsborough and a large section of Balmoral. The  boundaries added in Lynfield and New Windsor at the expense of Onehunga, which returned to the  electorate after being cut out in 1999. The Mount Roskill electorate is working class and multi-ethnic, with a high Pacific Island and Asian population, and has the highest number of overseas-born residents of any New Zealand electorate, nearly 40 per cent (as of 2001).

History
The existing  seat was renamed , with its boundaries shifted to fall in between Auckland and Waitakere cities. Named Mount Roskill, it was the first new seat drawn since the introduction of Mixed Member Proportional voting three years previous.

So far there have been two MPs for Mount Roskill, both of the Labour Party, Phil Goff and Michael Wood.
After Goff was elected Mayor of Auckland in October 2016, a by-election date was set for 3 December 2016. Michael Wood won the by-election with more than half the votes.

Members of Parliament
Key

List MPs

Members of Parliament elected from party lists in elections where that person also unsuccessfully contested the Mount Roskill electorate. Unless otherwise stated, all MPs terms began and ended at general elections.

Key

   

1Wang was elected from the party list in November 2004 following the expulsion of Donna Awatere Huata.
2Blue resigned from Parliament on 20 May 2013.
3Coates was elected from the party list in October 2016 following the resignation of Kevin Hague.

Election results

2020 election

2017 election

2016 by-election

2014 election

2011 election

Electorate (as at 26 November 2011): 46,332

2008 election

2005 election

2002 election

1999 election

Table footnotes

References

External links
Electorate profile, Parliamentary Library

New Zealand electorates in the Auckland Region
1999 establishments in New Zealand